Leroy L. Chang (20 January 1936 – 10 August 2008) was an experimental physicist and solid state electronics researcher and engineer. Born in China, he studied in Taiwan and then the United States, obtaining his doctorate from Stanford University in 1963. As a research physicist he studied semiconductors for nearly 30 years at IBM's Thomas J. Watson Research Center, New York. This period included pioneering work on superlattice heterostructures with Nobel Prize-winning physicist Leo Esaki.

In 1993, Chang moved from New York to Hong Kong, switching from industrial research into academia in anticipation of the 1997 transfer of the British colony to China. He was among the first wave of recruits to the Hong Kong University of Science and Technology. Over the following 14 years he helped build the university's reputation in his roles as Dean of Science, Professor of Physics, Vice-President for Academic Affairs, and Emeritus Professor. He retired in 2001.

Honours bestowed on Chang included membership of the US National Academy of Sciences, the Chinese Academy of Sciences, and Academia Sinica, the national academy of Taiwan. Awards received included the International Prize for New Materials (1985), the David Sarnoff Award (1990) and the Stuart Ballantine Medal (1993). Chang's death in 2008 was marked with memorial services, and a symposium in his memory was held the following year.

Early life and education
Leroy L. Chang's family was from Jiutai County, Jilin province in Northeastern China (Manchuria). After Manchuria was occupied by Imperial Japan in 1931, his family escaped to inland China and Chang was born on 20 January 1936 in Kaifeng, Henan province. His mother, Li Xiangheng, was one of the first group of women elected to the Legislative Yuan in 1948.

After moving to Taiwan, Chang studied electrical engineering at National Taiwan University, graduating in 1957. He obtained his master's degree in 1961 at the University of South Carolina. His doctorate (PhD) in solid-state electronics and electrical engineering was awarded by Stanford University in 1963.

Industry, research and academia
Between 1963 and 1992, with the exception of a sabbatical year, Chang worked at IBM's Thomas J. Watson Research Center, New York, USA. He held the position of researcher for some 12 years (1963 to 1968; 1969 to 1975), with a sabbatical year as Associate Professor at the Department of Electrical Engineering at the Massachusetts Institute of Technology (1968-9). On his return to IBM research, he spent 9 years as manager of its Molecular Beam Epitaxy section (1975 to 1984). This was followed by 7 years as manager of the Quantum Structure section (1985 to 1992). His research included semiconductor physics, low-dimensional electron systems, and nanostructures. In the 1970s, he pioneered development of quantum well and superlattice structure (SLS) techniques.

One of the key results from Chang's work in this period was using molecular beam epitaxy to grow superlattice structures in semiconductors. This research was described in a 1973 paper in Journal of Vacuum Science and Technology that was cited multiple times over the following years. Eleven years later, in 1984, this pioneering research paper was featured as a Citation Classic by ISI, an organisation that tracks and measures impact factor and citation frequency and volume for journals and individual research papers. Commentary for this retrospective article was provided by Chang. The impact of the research carried out in the 1970s by Chang and his colleagues, including Nobel Prize-winning Leo Esaki and Ray Tsu, was highlighted by IBM researchers Theis and Coufal in 2004:

Leo Esaki, Ray Tsu, and Leroy Chang began to envision and investigate designed quantum structures — which are based on interfaces between lattice-matched compound semiconductors — early in the 1970s. Ever since, the study of electronic systems of minute dimensions has ranked among the most exciting areas of condensed-matter physics.

After 29 years at IBM, Chang moved from industrial research into academia, being appointed the first Dean of Science at Hong Kong University of Science and Technology (HKUST) in 1993. This was a new university, having been established in 1991. Chang's arrival was described in a 2011 account of the rise of this university: "Other recruits during the first decade included Leroy Chang, a world-renowned experimental physicist from International Business Machines (IBM)". Chang held the position of Dean of Science until 1998, when he became Vice President of Academic Affairs until stepping down from this role in 2000. During and after this period, from 1997 until his retirement in 2001, he was also Professor of Physics and Electrical and Electronic Engineering at the university. Chang's departure from New York and arrival in Hong Kong in 1993 was part of a wider influx that saw many leading scientists and researchers taking up positions at universities and institutions in the British colony to be able to advantage of the opportunities presented by the 1997 transfer to Chinese control. Quoted in an article in 1996, Chang stated:

I would never have come to Hong Kong if it was going to remain just a British colony. We came because of 1997.

In addition to his work at HKUST, Chang also supported other science and technology institutions in Hong Kong and the wider region. From 1996 to 1998, he was President of the Hong Kong Institute of Science. In 1998, Chang played a key role in the founding and establishment of the Research Center for Applied Sciences (RCAS) of the Academia Sinica in Taiwan, serving on its advisory committee. He was Emeritus Professor at the Hong Kong University of Science and Technology from his retirement on 15 March 2001 until his death.

Awards and honours
1984: Fellow of the American Physical Society
1985: American Physical Society's International Prize for New Materials (shared with Leo Esaki and Raphael Tsu): "For his conception of artificial semiconductor superlattices and his recognition that such structures have realizable and ... novel electronic properties. His sustained experimental and theoretical efforts have helped lead the way to versatile new materials and technologies."
1988: Member of the National Academy of Engineering: "For pioneering achievements in superlattice heterostructures."
1990: Fellow of the Institute of Electrical and Electronics Engineers: "For contributions to superlattices and semiconductor quantum wells."
1990: IEEE's David Sarnoff Award: "For pioneering contributions to the realization and development of quantum wells and superlattices."
1993: Franklin Institute's Stuart Ballantine Medal (Physics)
1994: Member of the United States National Academy of Sciences
1994: Foreign Member of the Chinese Academy of Sciences (one of the first 14 foreign members, elected 8 June 1994)
1994: Academician of Academia Sinica (Taiwan)
1994: Member of the Hong Kong Academy of Engineering Sciences
1995: Honorary Doctor of Science (D.Sc.) from HKUST

Death and tributes
Chang died on 10 August 2008 in California, USA. Memorial services were held in the El Camino Memorial Park, San Diego, USA, and at the Hong Kong University of Science and Technology. A memorial symposium in his honour, 'Recent Advances in Applied Sciences', was held in 2009 at the Academia Sinica. The symposium program included "A Tribute to Academician Leroy Chang" and "Remembering Leroy: from SL/QW to RCAS". At the time of his death, tributes were paid to Chang by his HKUST colleagues, including the university's founding president Chia-Wei Woo:

Leroy was always exuberant and high-spirited, logical and sensible, forceful and clear, efficient and effective – and always full of wit and humor. As Dean of Science and Vice-President for Academic Affairs, he gave up his beloved and world-renowned scientific career to work totally selflessly towards providing a sound academic environment for his colleagues. HKUST's founding members could not have had a stronger comrade-in-arms in building this new university. I so very deeply mourn his passing.

Personal life 
Chang's daughter Leslie T. Chang is an author and journalist who is married to Peter Hessler, author of several books about China.

References

External links
Photograph of Leroy L. Chang (1) (Array of Contemporary American Physicists)
Photograph of Leroy L. Chang (2) (National Academy of Engineering)
Hetero-superlattice PN junctions (US Patent 5416337)
Superlattice ultrasonic wave generator (US Patent 4469977)
Consolidation with an Eye to the Future, 1999 interview with Chang as new  for Academic Affairs (HKUST)

1936 births
2008 deaths
Members of the United States National Academy of Sciences
Foreign members of the Chinese Academy of Sciences
National Taiwan University alumni
IBM employees
Academic staff of the Hong Kong University of Science and Technology
Fellows of the American Physical Society
Members of Academia Sinica
Fellow Members of the IEEE
Semiconductor physicists
20th-century American physicists
20th-century Taiwanese physicists
Taiwanese emigrants to the United States
Stanford University alumni
Taiwanese people from Henan
Physicists from Henan
Chinese emigrants to the United States
Writers from Kaifeng
University of South Carolina alumni
Chinese science writers